Kombat is a town in Namibia.

Kombat may also refer to:
 Kombat (military rank) 
 Kombat (photograph), a World War II photograph
 Kombat Armouring, a Russian armoured vehicle and car manufacturer
 Kombat (song), a song made by Lyube as a tribute to World War II veterans

See also
Combat (disambiguation)
Mortal Kombat, a video game franchise